The Immediate Geographic Region of Unaí is one of the 3 immediate geographic regions in the Intermediate Geographic Region of Patos de Minas, one of the 70 immediate geographic regions in the Brazilian state of Minas Gerais and one of the 509 of Brazil, created by the National Institute of Geography and Statistics (IBGE) in 2017.

Municipalities 

It comprises 11 municipalities.

 Arinos
 Bonfinópolis de Minas
 Buritis
 Cabeceira Grande
 Dom Bosco
 Formoso
 Natalândia
 Riachinho
 Unaí
 Uruana de Minas
 Urucuia

See also 

 List of Intermediate and Immediate Geographic Regions of Minas Gerais

References 

Geography of Minas Gerais